"Kids Say the Darndest Things" is a song written by Billy Sherrill and Glenn Sutton, and recorded by American country music artist Tammy Wynette. According to the liner notes of her 1992 boxed set, "Tears of Fire: The 25th Anniversary Collection," the song was recorded in 1969. It would shortly serve as the title track of a compilation album of Wynette's child-themed songs.

Song Background
In the song, the narrator reveals her marital problems, by way of innocent comments her small children repeat, which they'd overheard their parents make ("My four-year old said 'I want a divorce', now where did she hear that").

Chart performance
The song was released in March 1973 as the only single from her album of the same name. It was Wynette's thirteenth number one on the U.S. country singles chart, staying at number one for a single week and spending a total of thirteen weeks on the chart.

References

Tammy Wynette songs
1973 singles
Songs written by Billy Sherrill
Songs written by Glenn Sutton
Song recordings produced by Billy Sherrill
Epic Records singles
1973 songs